The action of 15 June 1780 was a minor naval engagement took place during the American War of Independence between a French privateer frigate and a Royal Navy 32-gun fifth-rate HMS  Apollo off the coast near Ostend.

In mid June  HMS Apollo under the command of Philemon Pownoll was cruising in company with the 32-gun , under Captain the Hon. George Murray. On the 15th a cutter was sighted while cruising in the North Sea and Murray was sent to investigate it. After closing to within gunshot of the cutter by 10.30am, a large sail was observed standing off the land. Whilst Cleopatra was taking the cutter, Apollo went to investigate the large sail. The two ships closed, tacking about to gain the weather gauge, and eventually opened fire. Apollos opponent was the 26-gun French privateer Stanislaus, and after a period of tacking, the two engaged in broadsides while running for Ostend. After nearly an hour of intense cannonading Pownoll was hit by a cannonball and killed. Lieutenant Edward Pellew who succeeded to the command continued the battle eventually driving the Stanislaus on shore not far from Ostend. Apart from her captain, Apollo lost five men killed and had twenty wounded.

On the 18th, Lord Sandwich wrote to Pellew: "I will not delay informing you that I mean to give you immediate promotion as a reward for your gallant and officer-like conduct."

References 
Citations

Bibliography
 
 

Naval battles of the American Revolutionary War involving France
Naval battles of the American Revolutionary War
Conflicts in 1780
Ostend